Cryptandra spinescens is a species of flowering plant in the family Rhamnaceae and is endemic to New South Wales. It is a straggling, much-branched shrub with spiny side-branches, egg-shaped to lance-shaped leaves, and spike-like clusters of white, tube-shaped flowers.

Description
Both surfaces of the leaves are more or less glabrous. The flowers are usually borne singly on short side-branches in spike-like clusters with bracts at the base of each flower.

Taxonomy and naming
Cryptandra spinescens was first formally described in 1825 by Augustin Pyramus de Candolle in Prodromus Systematis Naturalis Regni Vegetabilis from an unpublished description by Franz Sieber. The specific epithet (spinescens) means "spinescent".

Distribution and habitat
This cryptandra usually grows in open forest, often in rocky places, on the coast and nearby ranges between the Hunter Valley, Bungonia National Park and Tullibigeal in eastern New South Wales.

References

spinescens
Rosales of Australia
Flora of New South Wales
Plants described in 1825
Taxa named by Franz Sieber